The Klimov TV2-117 (initially Isotov TV2-117) is a Soviet gas-turbine turboshaft engine intended for helicopter use. Designed in the early 1960s by the Isotov Design Bureau the engine became the first purpose built gas turbine engine for helicopter use by the Soviet Union with previous helicopter turbines being adapted aeroplane powerplants. It was later produced by Klimov, production ending in 1997.

The TV2-117 is claimed to be the most popular helicopter powerplant worldwide and has accumulated over 100 million hours in service.

Variants
Source:Klimov.
TV2-117
Base variant.

TV2-117A 
Improved engine with more durable compressor stator blades.

TV2-117AG
Carbon sealed shaft bearings

TV2-117F
Limited production of engine certified to FAA airworthiness standards for Japan.

TV2-117TG
Multi-fuel variant, adapted to run on liquid petroleum gas and other fuels (gasoline or diesel fuel) and for use in cold climates.

Applications
 Antonov An-24 (intended coupled turboprop application)
 Mil Mi-8 
 Mil Mi-14

Specifications (TV2-117A)

See also

References

1960s turboshaft engines
TV2-117